Glebe (also known as church furlong, rectory manor or parson's close(s)) is an area of land within an ecclesiastical parish used to support a parish priest.  The land may be owned by the church, or its profits may be reserved to the church.

Medieval origins
In the Roman Catholic, Anglican and Presbyterian traditions, a glebe is land belonging to a benefice and so by default to its incumbent.  In other words, "glebe is land (in addition to or including the parsonage house/rectory and grounds) which was assigned to support the priest".

Glebe land can include strips in the open-field system or portions grouped together into a compact plot of land. In early times, tithes provided the main means of support for the parish clergy, but glebe land was either granted by any lord of the manor of the church's parish (sometimes the manor would have boundaries coterminous with the parish but in most instances it would be smaller), or accumulated from other donations of particular pieces of land.  Occasionally all or part of the glebe was  appropriated, devoted or assigned to a priory or college. In the case where the whole glebe was given to impropriators they would become the lay rector(s) (plural where the land is now subdivided), in which case the general law of tithes would resume on that land, and in England and Wales chancel repair liability would now apply to the lay rectors just as it had to the rector.

The amount of such land varied from parish to parish, occasionally forming a complete glebe farm. From 1571 onwards, the incumbent of the benefice would  record information about the glebe at ecclesiastical visitations in a "glebe terrier" (Latin terra, land). Glebe land could also entail complete farms, individual fields, houses (messuages), mills or works.   A holder of a benefice could retain the glebe for his own use, usually for agricultural exploitation, or he could  "farm" it (i.e., lease it, a term also used) to others and retain a rent as income.

Britain

Church of England
Glebe associated with the Church of England ceased to belong to individual incumbents as from 1 April 1978, by virtue of the Endowments and Glebe Measure 1976. It became vested on that date, "without any conveyance or other assurance", in the Diocesan Board of Finance of the diocese to which the benefice owning the glebe belonged, even if the glebe was in another diocese. But see 'Parsonages & Glebe Diocesan Manual 2012' for current legislation.

Scotland
Glebe land in Scotland was subject to an Act of Parliament in 1925 which meant that it would be transferred little by little to the General Trustees of the Church of Scotland.

Anglo-America
In Bermuda and the Thirteen Colonies of Great Britain where the Church of England was the established church, glebe land was distributed by the colonial government and was often farmed or rented out by the church rector to cover living expenses. The Dutch Reformed Church also provided glebes for the benefit of the pastor; it continued this practice through at least the 1850s. In some cases associations with former glebe properties is retained in the local names, for example: Glebe Road in Arlington County, Virginia, the community of Glebe in Hampshire County, West Virginia, Glebe Mountain in Londonderry, Windham County, Vermont, Glebe Hill, near Tucker's Town, Bermuda, another Glebe Hill in Southampton Parish, Bermuda, and The Glebe Road in Pembroke Parish, Bermuda.  Ottawa neighbourhood The Glebe was originally land dedicated to support St Andrew's Presbyterian Church.

The Baptist, Presbyterian and other churches that were not established in Virginia succeeded in 1802 and passage in the legislature of the Glebe Act, whereby whether glebes were sold by the overseers of the poor for the benefit of the indigent in the parish. The Episcopal Church was weakened by the new law, but in the Carolinas the glebes remained in the hands of the church and either were worked by the minister or rented out by them.

See also
 Chancel repair liability
 Manse—a dwelling and, historically in ecclesiastical contexts, the amount of land needed to support a single family

Notes

References

Further reading

Christianity in the Middle Ages
Church of England